The Caribbean Forum (CARIFORUM) is a subgroup of the Organisation of African, Caribbean and Pacific States and serves as a base for economic dialogue with the European Union. It was established in 1992. Its membership comprises the 15 Caribbean Community states, along with the Dominican Republic. In 2008, they signed the CARIFORUM-EU Economic Partnership Agreement with the European Union. Guyana and Haiti expressed reservations and did not attend the signing ceremony.

See also

 EU-African, Caribbean and Pacific Group of States
 ACP-EU Development Cooperation
 EU-ACP  Economic Partnership Agreements (EPA) with the ACP countries
 ACP–EU Joint Parliamentary Assembly

References

Institutions of the Caribbean Community
Organisation of African, Caribbean and Pacific States
ACP–European Union relations
Economy of the Caribbean Community
Foreign relations of the Caribbean
Foreign relations of the European Union
International organizations based in the Caribbean
Trade blocs
Organizations established in 1992
1990s establishments in the Caribbean
1992 establishments in North America